705 Naval Air Squadron was first formed as a flight in 1936 from No 447 Flight Royal Air Force and operated Swordfish torpedo bombers from battlecruisers. It achieved squadron status in 1939 before being disbanded in 1940. The squadron was re-formed briefly in 1945 and then again in 1947 as a fleet requirements unit to evaluate naval use of helicopters. Since the 1950s the squadron has been involved in the basic training of helicopter aircrew, and currently forms part of No. 1 Flying Training School at RAF Shawbury.

History

Pre-war and World War II (1936–1945)
705 Squadron was formed from No 447 Flight Royal Air Force, standing up in June 1936. Operational control of naval aviation was returned to the Royal Navy on 30 July 1937, and during this period the squadron operated the Fairey Swordfish biplane torpedo bomber from the battlecruisers Repulse and Renown. The aircraft were equipped with floats so that they could be launched from the ships by catapult and then recovered from the water by crane. 705 achieved squadron status in 1939. Early in World War II the squadron saw service protecting troop convoys and hunting raiders on the North America and West Indies Station. After disembarkation to RNAS Lee-on-Solent in 1939, the squadron was disbanded in 1940. 705 Naval Air Squadron was briefly reformed in 1945 and carried out the role of torpedo training.

Fleet Requirements Unit (1947–1950)
In May 1947, 705 Squadron was re-commissioned at RNAS Gosport with the Sikorsky Hoverfly element from 771 NAS. At first the squadron operated as a fleet requirements unit, and was responsible for the evaluation of the helicopter for use at sea. On 1 February 1947 Lieutenant K Reed carried out the first helicopter deck landing on a Royal Navy ship when he landed on HMS Vanguard off Portland.

Helicopter flying training (1950–1997)
The squadron gradually became responsible for the basic flying training of Royal Naval helicopter pilots and was re-equipped during the 1950s with the Westland Dragonfly, the Hiller HT1 and the Sikorsky S55. The squadron moved to RNAS Culdrose in 1957 where the later marks of Hiller and Whirlwind were introduced. These types were replaced in 1974 by the Westland Gazelle HT.2. Between 1975 and 1992 the instructors of the squadron performed as the 'Sharks' helicopter display team at up to 20 air displays every year both in the UK and abroad.

Tri-service basic flying training (1997–2018)
In April 1997 705 NAS disbanded and reformed at RAF Shawbury in Shropshire as part of the Defence Helicopter Flying School (DHFS), flying the  Eurocopter Squirrel HT Mk 1 helicopter.

UKMFTS (2018 – present)
Remaining as part of DHFS but now forming one of the elements of the UK Military Flying Training System (UKMFTS), the Squadron began flying the H135 Juno HT Mk1 in April 2018.

Current role

Within No. 1 Flying Training School (1 FTS) and under 2 Maritime Air Wing (2 MAW), 705 Squadron provides basic and advanced rotary wing flying training for all three services pilots and rear crew. As the busiest Squadron within 1 FTS, 705 Squadron teaches both pilots and crewman a vast number of different disciplines including advanced handling, instrument flying, medium and low level navigation, mountain flying and night flying including low level navigation with NVD.

In addition to pure flying training, 705 Squadron also provides a naval focus for naval aircrew operating within an otherwise joint service and largely civilian-run organisation. The Squadron is commanded by a Royal Navy Lieutenant Commander, and has a Royal Navy "Senior Pilot", while the Flight Commander billets are filled in by Qualified Helicopter Instructors from any of the three services. Naval graduates of DHFS are streamed towards Leonardo Merlin – MPH, Leonardo Merlin – Commando or Leonardo Wildcat AH / Wildcat HMA training Squadrons.

Aircraft flown
The squadron has flown a number of aircraft types since its formation, including:
 Blackburn Shark II/SP
 Fairey Swordfish I/SP & III
 Sikorsky Hoverfly I & II
 Saunders-Roe Skeeter
 Westland Dragonfly HR.1, HR.3 & HR.5
 Hiller HT.1 & HT.2
 Sikorsky S55
 Westland Whirlwind HAS.22, HAR.1, HAR.3 & HAS.7
 Westland Wasp HAS.1
 Westland Gazelle HT.2
 Eurocopter Squirrel
 Airbus H-135 Juno HT.1

Commanders
 Lt Cdr Becky Frater (2013 – July 2015)
 Lt Cdr Scott Hughes (July 2015 – July 2017)
 Lt Cdr Matt Robinson (July 2017 – October 2017)
 Lt Cdr Paul Ryan (April 2018 – December 2019)
 Lt Cdr Phil Crompton (January 2020 - Present)

References

External links
 Official Website

700 series Fleet Air Arm squadrons
Military units and formations established in 1936
Military of the United Kingdom in Cornwall
Air squadrons of the Royal Navy in World War II
Flying training squadrons